The Tennessee Advisory Commission on Intergovernmental Relations (TACIR) is an intergovernmental body of state and local governments in the U.S. state of Tennessee that has the purpose of providing a forum for discussion and resolution of intergovernmental problems and providing research support to improve the overall quality of government in that state. TACIR was established as a permanent nonpartisan body in 1978 by action of the Tennessee General Assembly.

Tennessee was one of several states that formed commissions on intergovernmental relations, patterned to some extent on the United States Advisory Commission on Intergovernmental Relations, during the 1970s and 1980s.

Membership 
The commission has 25 members, including 10 members and one appointee of the state legislature, 10 officials from local governments, two officials of the executive branch of the state government, and two private citizens. The legislative members are the chairmen of the Finance, Ways and Means committees of the two houses of the General Assembly, the Comptroller of the Treasury, four additional members of the Tennessee House of Representatives and four additional members of the Tennessee State Senate appointed to four-year terms. The local government members, all of whom are appointed to four-year terms, are four elected county officials, four elected municipal officials, one member nominated by the County Officials Association of Tennessee, and one member nominated by the state's development districts.

References

External links

Government of Tennessee
Government agencies established in 1978